Gilbert Vallanchon (2 October 1941 – 24 March 2017) was a French rower. He competed in the men's double sculls event at the 1968 Summer Olympics.

References

1941 births
2017 deaths
French male rowers
Olympic rowers of France
Rowers at the 1968 Summer Olympics
Sportspeople from Rouen